Aphrissa orbis, the orbed sulphur, is a butterfly in the  family Pieridae. It is native to Hispaniola and Cuba but is a very rare stray to Florida. The habitat consists of tropical moist forests above 500 meters.

The upper surface of the male forewings is pale lemon yellow with a large orange patch on the basal third. The female upper surface is deep ochre, the underside of the hindwing with a large brown patch. There are multiple generations per year on Cuba and Hispaniola. They feed on flower nectar of various flowers, including Ageratum conyzoides, Antigonon leptotus and Hibiscus species.

The larvae feed on Poinciana pulcherrima.

Subspecies
The following subspecies are recognised:
Aphrissa orbis orbis (Cuba)
Aphrissa orbis browni (Munroe, 1947) (Haiti)

References

Coliadinae
Butterflies described in 1832